Jean Tournier (3 April 1926 – 9 December 2004) was a French cinematographer.

He was born in Toulon, France. He is known for The Day of the Jackal and Moonraker.

Filmography 
Quai du Point-du-Jour (1960)
On n'enterre pas le dimanche (1960)
L'Homme à femmes (1960)
Amélie ou le temps d'aimer (1961)
Les bras de la nuit (1961)
Les Mystères de Paris (1962)
The Train (1964)
Allez France! (1964)
Faites vos jeux, mesdames (1965)
Les Deux Orphelines (1965)
Compartiment tueurs (1965)
La bourse et la vie (1966)
Roger la Honte (1966)
Le voyage du père (1966)
Un homme de trop (1967)
Le Grand Bidule (1967)
L'Homme à la Buick (1968)
Le Petit Baigneur (1968)
L'Ardoise (1970)
Start the Revolution Without Me (1970)
Comptes à rebours (1971)
La Cavale (1971)
Le Viager (1972)
Trois milliards sans ascenseur (1972)
The Day of the Jackal (1973)
Les gaspards (1974)
Les guichets du Louvre (1974)
Les Misérables (1978) TV Movie
Moonraker (1979)
The Fiendish Plot of Dr. Fu Manchu (1980)
Trois hommes à abattre (1980)
Pour la peau d'un flic (1981)
Le Battant (1983)
Femmes de personne (1984)
Mistral's Daughter (1984) TV Mini-Series
Camille (1984) TV Movie
Target (1985)
Sins (1986) TV Mini-Series
Monte Carlo (1986) TV Mini-Series
Napoleon and Josephine: A Love Story (1987) TV Mini-Series
Bonjour l'angoisse (1988)
Les Mannequins d'osier (1989)
Les 1001 Nuits (1990)
La Neige et le Feu (1991)
Cache cash (1994)

External links 
 
Jean Tournier - le cinema francais

French cinematographers
Mass media people from Toulon
1926 births
2004 deaths